Henry Joseph Weld-Blundell (25 July 1848 – 8 September 1901) was a politician in Queensland, Australia. He was a Member of the Queensland Legislative Assembly, representing Clermont from 1879 to 1883.

Personal life 
He was born at Ince Blundell, the second son of Thomas Weld Blundell. He died of typhoid fever at Buckingham Gate, London, leaving a widow and infant daughter.

References

Members of the Queensland Legislative Assembly
1848 births
1901 deaths
19th-century Australian politicians
Henry Joseph Weld-Blundell